Coleophora percnoceros is a moth of the family Coleophoridae. It is found in the Kashmir region of what was British India.

The wingspan is about 12 mm. The head and thorax are light grey slightly mixed with white. The palpi are without projection, grey and internally white. The antennae are dark grey. The forewings are light ash-grey, although the costal edge is suffused whitish from the base to beyond the middle. The veins are indicated by faint streaks of whitish suffusion. The hindwings are light grey.

References

percnoceros
Moths of Asia
Moths described in 1933